Malcolm Ross Parks is an American academic, professor emeritus of communication at the University of Washington.

He earned a Ph.D. from Michigan State University in 1976, working under the supervision of Gerald R. Miller. His interests are in interpersonal relationships, organizational change, persuasion, and social networks.

He serves on the board of the Journal of Computer-Mediated Communication and has been editor-in-chief of the Journal of Communication. He was considered as a scholar and a visionary.

Books
Parks, M.R. (2006). Personal Relationships and Personal Networks. Mahwah, NJ: Lawrence Erlbaum Associates.

References

External links 

 Faculty website

Living people
University of Washington faculty
Year of birth missing (living people)